Faze TV may refer to:
 A television series in Canada aimed at teenaged girls.
 A planned (and then later scrapped) British TV Channel aimed at the LBGT community.